Chris Engler (born March 1, 1959) is an American former National Basketball Association (NBA) player. Engler was drafted from the University of Wyoming by the Golden State Warriors in the third round of the 1982 NBA draft.  Engler began his collegiate career with the Minnesota Golden Gophers before transferring to Wyoming.    Engler played two seasons with the Warriors, then subsequently had short stints with the Milwaukee Bucks, Chicago Bulls, New Jersey Nets, and Portland Trail Blazers before staying with the Nets for the final two seasons of his NBA career.  Engler finished with career averages of 1.8 points per game and 2.0 rebounds per game.

He is currently a part-time Lawyer and full-time Social Studies teacher at Stillwater Area High School.

Career statistics

NBA

Regular season

|-
| style="text-align:left;"| 
| style="text-align:left;"| Golden State
| 54 || 1 || 6.8 || .404 || – || .313 || 1.9 || .2 || .1 || .3 || 1.5
|-
| style="text-align:left;"| 
| style="text-align:left;"| Golden State
| 46 || 1 || 7.8 || .398 || – || .609 || 2.1 || .2 || .2 || .1 || 1.7
|-
| style="text-align:left;"| 
| style="text-align:left;"| New Jersey
| 7 || 0 || 10.9 || .438 || – || .556 || 3.9 || .0 || .3 || .6 || 2.7
|-
| style="text-align:left;"| 
| style="text-align:left;"| Chicago
| 3 || 0 || 1.0 || .500 || – || – || .7 || .0 || .0 || .0 || .7
|-
| style="text-align:left;"| 
| style="text-align:left;"| Milwaukee
| 1 || 0 || 3.0 || .000 || – || – || 1.0 || .0 || .0 || 1.0 || .0
|-
| style="text-align:left;"| 
| style="text-align:left;"| Portland
| 7 || 0 || 2.4 || .500 || – || 1.000 || 1.1 || .1 || .1 || .1 || 1.6
|-
| style="text-align:left;"| 
| style="text-align:left;"| Milwaukee
| 5 || 0 || 9.6 || .250 || – || 1.000 || 3.2 || .6 || .2 || .2 || 1.4
|-
| style="text-align:left;"| 
| style="text-align:left;"| New Jersey
| 18 || 0 || 7.2 || .516 || – || .667 || 1.8 || .2 || .2 || .5 || 2.2
|-
| style="text-align:left;"| 
| style="text-align:left;"| New Jersey
| 54 || 0 || 7.4 || .409 || – || .886 || 1.8 || .3 || .2 || .1 || 1.9
|-
| style="text-align:center;" colspan="2"| Career
| 195 || 2 || 7.2 || .411 || – || .677 || 2.0 || .2 || .2 || .2 || 1.8

Playoffs

|-
| style="text-align:left;"| 1985
| style="text-align:left;"| Milwaukee
| 1 || 0 || 6.0 || 1.000 || – || – || 2.0 || .0 || .0 || .0 || 2.0

References

External links
 Career statistics

1959 births
Living people
American expatriate basketball people in Italy
American expatriate basketball people in Sweden
American men's basketball players
Basketball players from Minnesota
Centers (basketball)
Chicago Bulls players
Golden State Warriors draft picks
Golden State Warriors players
Milwaukee Bucks players
Minnesota Golden Gophers men's basketball players
New Jersey Nets players
People from Stillwater, Minnesota
Portland Trail Blazers players
Rapid City Thrillers players
Wyoming Cowboys basketball players
Wyoming Wildcatters players
Alviks BK players